This is a list of the National Register of Historic Places in inner Harris County, Texas, defined as within the I-610 loop within Harris County, Texas, but excluding those places in Downtown Houston and those in Houston Heights, which are listed separately.  (Downtown Houston is defined as the area enclosed by Interstate 10, Interstate 45, and Interstate 69.  Houston Heights is defined, approximately, by Highway I-10 on the South, I-610 on the North, 45 on the East and Durham on the West.)

The locations of National Register properties and districts (at least for all showing latitude and longitude coordinates below) may be seen in a map by clicking on "Map of all coordinates."

Current listings
 

|}

Former listings

|}

See also
List of National Historic Landmarks in Texas
National Register of Historic Places listings in Texas
Recorded Texas Historic Landmarks in Harris County

References

External links
 University of Houston Digital Library: vintage photo of the Houston Cotton Exchange Building in the early 20th−century

Harris County, Texas
inner Harris
National Register of Historic Places in Harris County, Texas